The Listowel Jets were a senior hockey team based out of Listowel, Ontario, Canada.  They played in the Western Ontario Athletic Association Senior Hockey League.

History
The Jets played from 2002–2006, and in 97 games, they had a record of 22-70-2-5.  Their best season was in 2004-05, when they had a record of 8-14-1-2, for 19 points, and finished in 11th place in the league.  In the 2005-06 playoffs, after losing to the Durham Thundercats in 3 games in the "AA" playoffs, they would be relegated to the "A" playoffs, and nearly upset the heavily favoured Palmerston 81's, taking them to 7 games.  The Jets folded in the summer of 2006, and the WOAA placed an expansion team in Thedford, Ontario to replace them.

Season-by-season record
Note: GP = Games played, W = Wins, L = Losses, T= Tie, OTL = Overtime Losses, Pts = Points, GF = Goals for, GA = Goals against

More information will be added as more becomes available

Related links
Listowel, Ontario
Western Ontario Athletic Association
WOAA Senior Hockey League

External links
WOAA Website
WOAA Senior Hockey Website

Senior ice hockey teams
Ice hockey teams in Ontario
Defunct ice hockey teams in Canada
Perth County, Ontario
2002 establishments in Ontario
2006 disestablishments in Ontario
Ice hockey clubs established in 2002
Ice hockey clubs disestablished in 2006